Forne Burkin (born 28 October 1998) is a New Zealand rugby union player.She debuted for New Zealand against the United States at the 2019 Women's Rugby Super Series in San Diego.

Biography 
Burkin made her debut for Hawke’s Bay in the 2017 season of the Farah Palmer Cup. In 2018, she moved to Christchurch to study at Lincoln University. She then debuted for Canterbury against Bay of Plenty. After her Black Ferns debut, she returned to play for Hawke's Bay in the 2019 season of the Farah Palmer Cup.

Burkin earned her second international cap against the Wallaroos in the first of two test matches in Perth in 2019.

In 2020, she was named as captain for Hawke's Bay. She was not considered for the Black Ferns at the end of that year due to injury.

References

External links 

 Black Ferns Profile

1998 births
Living people
New Zealand female rugby union players
New Zealand women's international rugby union players